Since the first printing of Carl Linnaeus's Species Plantarum in 1753, plants have been assigned one epithet or name for their species and one name for their genus, a grouping of related species. Thousands of plants have been named for people, including botanists and their colleagues, plant collectors, horticulturists, explorers, rulers, politicians, clerics, doctors, philosophers and scientists. Even before Linnaeus, botanists such as Joseph Pitton de Tournefort, Charles Plumier and Pier Antonio Micheli were naming plants for people, sometimes in gratitude for the financial support of their patrons.

Modern works include The Gardener's Botanical by Ross Bayton, Index of Eponymic Plant Names and Encyclopedia of Eponymic Plant Names by Lotte Burkhardt, Plants of the World by Maarten J. M. Christenhusz (lead author), Michael F. Fay and Mark W. Chase, The A to Z of Plant Names by Allan J. Coombes, the four-volume CRC World Dictionary of Plant Names by Umberto Quattrocchi, and Stearn's Dictionary of Plant Names for Gardeners by William T. Stearn; these supply the seed-bearing genera listed in the first column below. Excluded from this list are genus names not accepted (as of January 2021) at Plants of the World Online, which includes updates to Plants of the World (2017). 

Key 
Ba = listed in Bayton's The Gardener's Botanical
Bt = listed in Burkhardt's Encyclopedia of Eponymic Plant Names
Bu = listed in Burkhardt's Index of Eponymic Plant Names
Ch = listed in Christenhusz's Plants of the World
Co = listed in Coombes's The A to Z of Plant Names
Qu = listed in Quattrocchi's CRC World Dictionary of Plant Names
St = listed in Stearn's Dictionary of Plant Names for Gardeners

In addition, Burkhardt's Index is used as a reference for every row in the table.

Genera

See also 

 List of plant genus names with etymologies: A–C, D–K, L–P, Q–Z
 List of plant family names with etymologies

Notes

Citations

References 
 
   See http://creativecommons.org/licenses/by/4.0/ for license.
   See http://creativecommons.org/licenses/by/4.0/ for license. 
 
 
 
 See http://www.plantsoftheworldonline.org/terms-and-conditions for license.

Further reading 

 

Systematic
Systematic
Taxonomy (biology)
Glossaries of biology
Gardening lists
Genera named for people (Q-Z)
Named for people (Q-Z)
Wikipedia glossaries using tables